The 1994 Brighton International was a women's tennis tournament played on indoor carpet courts at the Brighton Centre in Brighton, England that was part of the Tier II of the 1994 WTA Tour. It was the 17th edition of the tournament and was held from 18 October until 23 October 1994. Second-seeded Jana Novotná won her second consecutive singles title at the event and earned $80,000 first-prize money.

Finals

Singles
 Jana Novotná defeated  Helena Suková 6–7(4–7), 6–3, 6–4
 It was Novotná's 2nd singles title of the year and the 9th of her career.

Doubles
 Manon Bollegraf /  Larisa Neiland defeated  Mary Joe Fernández /  Jana Novotná 4–6, 6–2, 6–3

Prize money

References

External links
 International Tennis Federation (ITF) tournament event details
 Tournament draws

Brighton Internationals
Brighton International
Brighton International
Brighton International
1994 in women's tennis
Bright